Dendropsophus baileyi is a species of frog in the family Hylidae.
It is endemic to Brazil.
Its natural habitats are subtropical or tropical moist lowland forests, freshwater marshes, intermittent freshwater marshes, arable land, pastureland, plantations, rural gardens, urban areas, heavily degraded former forest, ponds, irrigated land, seasonally flooded agricultural land, and canals and ditches.

References

baileyi
Endemic fauna of Brazil
Taxonomy articles created by Polbot
Amphibians described in 1953